Pleasant Valley School District is a public school district in Ventura County, California, United States. It is the oldest, continuously operated school district in Ventura County.

References

External links
 

School districts in Ventura County, California